Elza van den Heever (born 1979) is a South African soprano in opera and concert, who began her career as a mezzo-soprano. She has appeared in leading roles at major houses and concert halls of the world. One of her signature roles is Elisabetta in Donizetti's Maria Stuarda, which she performed for her debut at the Metropolitan Opera in 2012 and subsequently recorded live.

Career 
Born in Johannesburg as one of triplets, the daughter of a filmmaker and an actress, van den Heever was first trained as a mezzo-soprano, studying from age 18 at the San Francisco Conservatory of Music. She was part of the Merola Opera Program and the San Francisco Opera's Adler Fellowship, creating the role of Mary Custis Lee in Appomattox by Philip Glass, conducted by Dennis Russell Davies. In a transition process of five years, she learned new vocal technique and new roles. Her first major soprano role was Donna Anna in Mozart's Don Giovanni, stepping in at the San Francisco Opera in 2007. In 2008, she appeared as Giorgetta in Puccini's Il tabarro at the Oper Frankfurt, conducted by Nicola Luisotti. She recorded the role in a 2010 concert performance from the Konzerthaus in Vienna, conducted by Bertrand de Billy, with the Vienna Radio Symphony Orchestra, alongside Johan Botha as Luigi and Wolfgang Koch as Michele. Her interpretation was described as exciting, with feminine glow in the high register, velvety timbre in the middle range, and an impeccable technique ("mit fraulich leuchtenden Höhen, samtig timbrierter Mittellage und einer untadeligen Technik". Performing also at the Lyric Opera of Chicago and in Paris,  she appeared at the Bavarian State Opera in Munich in 2011 as Elsa in Wagner's Lohengrin, and in 2013 as Donna Anna.

She made her debut with the Metropolitan Opera in New York City in 2012 as Elisabetta in Donizetti's Maria Stuarda, in the opera's first production at the house, broadcast live and recorded. She sang  alongside Joyce DiDonato in the title role and Matthew Polenzani as Leicester, staged by David McVicar and conducted by Maurizio Benini. To appear convincing as the wig-bearing bald queen in the close-ups of the broadcast, in a production with rich historic costumes, she had her head shaved. In 2015, she first appeared in the title role of Bellini's Norma at the Bordeaux Opera.

References

External links 
 
 
 
 
 Elza van den Heever (management) arsis-artists.com
 Interview d'Elza van den Heever, soprano (in French) tutti-magazine.fr 2016
 Elza van den Heever San Francisco Opera

South African operatic sopranos
Living people
1979 births
San Francisco Conservatory of Music alumni
21st-century South African women opera singers
Musicians from Johannesburg